Wilmington Trust Company Bank is a historic bank building in Newark in New Castle County, Delaware. It was built about 1926 and is a one-story, rectangular plan brick structure with a cast concrete / cement Neoclassical facade.  It was built by the Farmer's Trust Company of Newark, which was acquired in 1952 by the Wilmington Trust Company.  It is owned today by M&T Bank, which bought Wilmington Trust in 2008.

It was added to the National Register of Historic Places in 1982.

References

Bank buildings on the National Register of Historic Places in Delaware
Commercial buildings completed in 1926
Buildings and structures in Newark, Delaware
National Register of Historic Places in New Castle County, Delaware